Rockin' is the ninth studio album by the Canadian rock band The Guess Who. It was originally released by RCA Records in 1972. It is the last album by the group to feature rhythm guitarist Greg Leskiw.

Two charting singles were released from the album. "Heartbroken Bopper" spent seven weeks on the Billboard Hot 100 peaking at number 47 and "Guns, Guns, Guns" spent six weeks on the Billboard Hot 100 peaking at number 70.

Release history
In addition to the usual 2 channel stereo version the album was also released by RCA in a 4 channel quadraphonic version on 8-track tape. The quad version was never released on the LP format.

In 2019 the album was reissued again in the UK by Dutton Vocalion on the Super Audio CD format. This disc is a 2 albums on 1 disc compilation which also contains the 1973 album The Best of The Guess Who Volume II. The Dutton Vocalion release contains the complete stereo and quad versions of both albums.

Reception
AllMusic's Joe Viglione: "As an artistic statement it's all very interesting, but for a band whose bread and butter was the Top 40, this stuff tempts fate a bit too much...  Rockin'  is a strange exercise whose best parts showed up on ''The Best of the Guess Who, Vol. 2."

Track listing
All songs written by Burton Cummings and Kurt Winter except noted.
Side one
"Heartbroken Bopper" - 4:52
"Get Your Ribbons On" - 2:36
"Smoke Big Factory" (Cummings, Winter, Jim Kale) - 3:57
"Arrivederci Girl" (Cummings) - 2:31
"Guns, Guns, Guns" (Cummings) - 4:59
Side two
"Running Bear" (J.P. Richardson) - 2:19
"Back to the City" - 3:37
"Your Nashville Sneakers" (Cummings) - 2:55
"Herbert's a Loser" (Greg Leskiw, Winter) - 3:35
"Hi Rockers!" - 6:50
a) "Sea of Love" (Phil Phillips, George Khoury)
b) "Heaven Only Moved Once Yesterday" (Winter) 
c) "Don't You Want Me" (Cummings)

2010 Iconoclassic Remaster Bonus Tracks
"Sea of Love" (Previously Unreleased)
"Lost Sheep" (Previously Unreleased)

Notes
On the album the song "Running Bear" was incorrectly credited to Curly Herdman and "Sea of Love" incorrectly credited to Don McGinnis.

Personnel
The Guess Who
Burton Cummings - lead vocals, keyboards, harmonica
Kurt Winter - lead guitar, backing vocals
Greg Leskiw - rhythm guitar, backing vocals, lead vocals on "Herbert's a Loser"
Jim Kale - bass, backing vocals
Garry Peterson - drums

Additional personnel
Brian Christian - engineer
Jack Richardson - producer

Charts
Album

Singles

References

1972 albums
The Guess Who albums
Albums produced by Jack Richardson (record producer)
RCA Victor albums